The discography of Zebrahead, an American punk rock band, currently consists of 13 studio albums, 2 compilation albums, 39 singles, 43 music videos, 4 video albums, 5 extended plays and 1 demo.

Zebrahead formed in 1996, releasing their self-titled debut album Zebrahead (more commonly known as Yellow due to the color of the cover) through independent label Doctor Dream Records in April 1998, before getting signed to Columbia Records and releasing their mainstream debut Waste of Mind in October later that year, which charted at No. 34 on the U.S Top Heatseekers chart, along with the single "Get Back", which charted on the U.S Hot Modern Rock Tracks charts at No. 32.

The band's follow-up album Playmate of the Year was released in August 2000 and charted at No. 4 on the U.S Top Heatseekers, No. 127 on the Billboard 200 and No. 20 on the Japanese charts. MFZB, released in October 2003, served as Zebrahead's fourth studio album, charting at No. 33 on the Top Heatseekers chart and No. 9 on the Japanese charts, earning the band's first official record certification there as gold. Shortly before the departure of band member Justin Mauriello, Zebrahead released Waste of MFZB exclusively in Japan, due to their popularity there. It eventually peaked on the charts there at No. 16.

With new band member Matty Lewis, Zebrahead released their sixth studio album Broadcast to the World first in Japan in February 2006, before being released in other territories later through the year. Its peak position at No. 10 on the Japanese charts earned the band their second gold certification from there and overall. Zebrahead's follow-up album Phoenix was released in the summer months of 2008 and charted at No. 30 on the U.S Top Heatseeks and No. 10 in Japan.

In late 2009, the band released their first covers album, titled Panty Raid, featuring songs by female musicians from the 1990s and 2000s. It peaked at No. 8 on the Japanese charts. Zebrahead released their ninth studio album Get Nice! in the summer of 2011. The follow-up Call Your Friends was released two years later in August 2013.

In 2014 the band started a crowd funding campaign via PledgeMusic.com to release a live performance recorded in Köln, Germany, on 19 October 2013. A download of the album was released to pledgers on 16 December 2014. The album was released along with a DVD of the performance. Both are entitled  Way More Beer, Live in Köln, Germany, October 19th, 2013.

Albums

Studio albums

Compilation albums

Extended plays

Demos

Singles

Music videos

DVDs

References

Discographies of American artists
Rap rock discographies
Punk rock group discographies